Wildhern is a small village and civil parish in the Test Valley district of Hampshire, England. It is in the civil parish of Tangley.    Its nearest town is Andover, which lies approximately 3.3 miles (5.3 km) south from the village.

Villages in Hampshire
Test Valley